Ross B. Craig (July 1, 1884 – June 27, 1949) was a star football player in Canadian football in the early 20th century. He played for several intermediate teams before playing for the Hamilton Alerts for two years where he won a Grey Cup championship in 1912. The following season, he joined the Interprovincial Rugby Football Union's Hamilton Tigers where he won another Grey Cup in 1913. He would finish his career with the Tigers in 1920, after playing five seasons with Hamilton.

Craig was born in Peterborough, Ontario, and died in Hamilton, Ontario.  He was inducted into the Canadian Football Hall of Fame in 1964 and into the Canada's Sports Hall of Fame in 1975.

References
 Canada's Sports Hall of Fame profile

External links

1884 births
1949 deaths
Players of Canadian football from Ontario
Hamilton Tigers football players
Canadian Football Hall of Fame inductees
Ontario Rugby Football Union players
Sportspeople from Peterborough, Ontario